White sun or White Sun may refer to:

 White Sun (musical group)
 White Sun, a 2016 Nepali film
 White Sun of the Desert, a 1969 Soviet film
 Blue Sky with a White Sun, an emblem of the Republic of China
 A star with a suitable spectral type

See also